Elizabeth Sabine (born October 1923 in London – died December 2015 in Los Angeles) was a voice strengthening specialist, whose work to the field of voice was acknowledged when she became the recipient of the Lifetime Achievement Award at the Los Angeles Music Awards in 2003.

Biography
Sabine was raised in Australia and spent much of her early years in the field of entertainment, frequently appearing as a vocalist on the live variety TV show In Melbourne Tonight.

In 1974, she moved to Los Angeles where she soon befriended Robert Mazzarella, a local singing teacher and operatic tenor. At the end of the 1970s, Elizabeth found she was able to refine the technique and strengthen the voices of hard rock and heavy metal music vocalists who often sung with vigorous screams and yells. Her technique enabled the singer to master their voice faster in comparison to the older methods available. Famous people like Axl Rose, singer of Guns N' Roses and front man Dave Mustaine, the founding member of Megadeth, have been tutored by Elizabeth who has also been named the Heavy Metal Grandma.

Lee Strasberg of the Lee Strasberg Theatre Institute of Los Angeles, enlisted Elizabeth in 1981 to strengthen the voices of his acting and singing students, and she did so for many years.

In 2008, Christian Rock band Barren Cross returned to the music world with new vocalist Dean Kohn who spent two years under Elizabeth Sabine. Singers and Songwriters Krickett & Pepper also studied under Ms. Sabine.

Her website contains images of herself with a small sample of former students  including Cypress Hill's B-Real, Seinfeld's Cosmo Kramer, Keel vocalist Ron Keel, Australian music export Men at Work's Colin Hay and actor Christopher Reeve.

References

External links
Official Elizabeth Sabine Website
Official site. Jon Paget with Elizabeth Sabine picture

1923 births
2015 deaths
Voice coaches
British emigrants to Australia
Australian emigrants to the United States